Greenop is a surname. Notable people with the surname include:

Frank Sydney Greenop (1913–1975), Australian journalist and writer
 (born 1989), Canadian ice hockey player

See also
Greeno
Greenops, Devonian trilobite